Mykhailivka is a village in the Vinnytsia Raion of the Vinnytsia Oblast of Ukraine. The area is 2.184 km2 and the population (2001 census) is 906 inhabitants. The village was founded in 1510.

On 30 April 1831, during the November Uprising, fighters under Captain Kurowski won a battle here against a Russian unit from Machnówka.

The postal code is 23203, the telephone area code is 432, and the KOATUU (territorial administrative classification) code is 0520681406.

References

Podolia Governorate

Villages in Vinnytsia Raion